Driek van Wissen (12 July 1943 – 21 May 2010) was a Dutch poet. He was born in Groningen. On 26 January 2005 he was chosen as the Dichter des Vaderlands (Poet Laureate of the Netherlands), following Gerrit Komrij. In 1987 the Dutch literary magazine De Tweede Ronde honored him by awarding him the Kees-Stip Prize for his career work and use of light verse. Van Wissen also published under the pen-name Albert Zondervan. He was a teacher in Hoogezand- Sappemeer at the Dr. Aletta Jacobs College from 1968 till 2005. He died in May 2010 in Istanbul.

External links
  Koninklijke Bibliotheek – Profile on Driek van Wissen
  The Official Website of Driek van Wissen

20th-century Dutch poets
21st-century Dutch poets
Dutch male poets
Dutch poets laureate
20th-century Dutch male writers
Dutch republicans
People from Groningen (city)
1943 births
2010 deaths